The 2010 Ukrainian Figure Skating Championships took place between December 20 and 23, 2009 in Dnipropetrovsk. Skaters competed in the disciplines of men's singles, ladies' singles, pair skating, and ice dancing on the senior level. The results of the national championships were used to choose the teams to the 2010 World Championships and the 2010 European Championships.

Results

Men

Ladies

Pairs

Ice dancing

External links
 2010 Ukrainian Figure Skating Championships results
 

Ukrainian Figure Skating Championships
Ukrainian Figure Skating Championships, 2010
2009 in figure skating
2009 in Ukrainian sport
2010 in Ukrainian sport
December 2009 sports events in Ukraine